Events in the year 2020 in Spain.

Incumbents
Monarch: Felipe VI
Prime Minister: Pedro Sánchez
President of the Congress of Deputies: Meritxell Batet
President of the Senate of Spain: Pilar Llop
President of the Supreme Court: Carlos Lesmes
President of the Constitutional Court: Juan José González Rivas
Attorney General: 
María José Segarra (until 15 January)
Luis Navajas (acting 15 January – 26 February)
Dolores Delgado (since 26 February)
Chief of the Defence Staff: Miguel Ángel Villarroya Vilalta
President of the Episcopal Conference: 
Ricardo Blázquez (until 3 March)
Juan José Omella (since 3 March)
Sánchez II Government

Regional presidents

 Andalusia: Juan Manuel Moreno Bonilla
 Aragón: Javier Lambán
 Asturias: Adrián Barbón
 Balearic Islands: Francina Armengol
 Basque Country: Iñigo Urkullu
 Canary Islands: Ángel Víctor Torres
 Cantabria: Miguel Ángel Revilla
 Castilla–La Mancha: Emiliano García-Page
 Castile and León: Alfonso Fernández Mañueco
 Catalonia: Quim Torra
 Extremadura: Guillermo Fernández Vara
 Galicia: Alberto Núñez Feijóo
 La Rioja: Concha Andreu
 Community of Madrid: Isabel Díaz Ayuso
 Region of Murcia: Fernando López Miras
 Navarre: María Chivite
 Valencian Community: Ximo Puig
 Ceuta: Juan Jesús Vivas
 Melilla: Eduardo de Castro

Events
25 January – Scheduled date for presentation of the 34th Goya Awards
19 February – The investigation into the Bolivian diplomatic incident is completed. The Spanish government accuses the Bolivian government of risking the safety of its diplomats while emphasizing the desire to continue good relations with the South American country.
COVID-19 pandemic in Spain

Deaths

January

7 January – Jaime Monzó (also spelled Jaume), swimmer (b. 1946).
8 January – Infanta Pilar, Duchess of Badajoz (b. 1936).
13 January – Isabel-Clara Simó, journalist and writer (b. 1943).
21 January – Meritxell Negre, singer (b. 1971).
22 January – Roser Rahola d'Espona, editor and baroness (b. 1914).
30 January – Mauro Varela, politician and banker (b. 1941).

February

4 February – José Luis Cuerda, director, screenwriter and producer (b. 1947)
8 February – Carlos Rojas Vila, author (b. 1928)
9 February – David Gistau, TV writer and novelist, brain injury (b. 1970).
10 February – Diana Garrigosa, teacher and activist (b. 1944).
12 February – Miguel Cordero del Campillo, veterinarian, parasitologist, academic and politician (b. 1925).
13 February – Rafael Romero Marchent, film director, actor and screenwriter (b. 1926).
18 February – Jaime Amat, Olympic field hockey player (b. 1941)
19 February – Fernando Morán, diplomat and politician (b. 1926).
24 February – Juan Eduardo Zúñiga, literary scholar and writer (b. 1919).
26 February – Eduardo Bort, guitarist (b. 1948).

March

9 March 
 José Jiménez Lozano, writer, Miguel de Cervantes Prize winner (b. 1930).
 Luis Racionero, writer (b. 1940).
18 March – Joaquín Peiró, football player and manager, (b. 1936).
20 March – Carlos Falcó, 5th Marquess of Griñón, socialite and entrepreneur, Grandee of Spain (b. 1937).
21 March – Lorenzo Sanz, businessman and sports executive (b. 1943).
22 March 
 Germà Colón, philologist (b. 1928).
Máximo Hernández, 74, football player and manager (b. 1945).
Benito Joanet, football player and coach (b. 1935).
José María Loizaga Viguri, businessman (b. 1936)
Carmen de Mairena, actress, cuplé singer and television personality (b. 1933).
23 March
 Lucia Bosè, Italian-born actress and beauty pageant winner (b. 1931).
 José Folgado, businessman and politician (b. 1944).
 José García González, psychiatrist and neurologist (b. 1938).
27 March – Jesús Gayoso Rey, Civil Guard lieutenant colonel (b. 1971).
28 March – Chato Galante, pro-democracy activist and political prisoner (b. 1948).
29 March – José Luis Capón, footballer (b. 1948).
31 March 
Rafael Gómez Nieto, resistance fighter (b. 1921).
Daniel Yuste, Olympic racing cyclist (b. 1944).

April

1 April – Ricardo Díez Hochleitner, economist and diplomat (b. 1928).
2 April – Goyo Benito, football player (b. 1946).
3 April – Francisco Hernando Contreras, housing developer (b. 1945).
4 April – Luis Eduardo Aute, artist (b. 1943).
6 April
Josep Maria Benet i Jornet, playwright and screenwriter (b. 1940).
Alfonso Cortina, businessman (b. 1944).
Riay Tatary, Syrian-born doctor and imam (b. 1948).
8 April – Miguel Jones, footballer (b. 1938).
10 April
Antonio Carro, politician (b. 1923).
Enrique Múgica, lawyer and politician (b. 1932).
Iris M. Zavala, Puerto Rican author, independence activist and intellectual (b. 1936).
11 April – Antonio Ferres, writer and poet (b. 1924).
12 April 
 Francisco Aritmendi, Olympic long-distance runner (b. 1938).
Mary Begoña, vedette and actress (b. 1929).
 Carlos Seco Serrano, historian (b. 1923).
13 April 
Baldiri Alavedra, footballer (b. 1944).
Juan Cotino, businessman and politician (b. 1950).
Landelino Lavilla Alsina, lawyer and politician (b. 1934).
16 April – Santiago Lanzuela, politician (b. 1948).
17 April – Jesús Vaquero, neurosurgeon (b. 1950).
18 April – Aurelio Campa, footballer (b. 1933).
20 April – Josep Sala Mañé, casteller (b. 1938).
21 April
 José María Calleja, journalist, political prisoner and anti-ETA activist (b. 1955).
 Miguel Ángel Troitiño, geographer (b. 1947).
22 April – El Príncipe Gitano, flamenco singer and actor (b. 1928).
23 April – Bernardino Lombao, athlete and personal trainer (b. 1938).

May

1 May
África Lorente Castillo, politician and activist (b. 1954).
Benjamín Moreno, footballer (b. 1955).
7 May
Antonio González Pacheco, Francoist police inspector and torturer (b. 1946).
Manuel Jove, businessman (b. 1941).
10 May – José López Calo, musicologist and priest (b. 1922).
11 May – Francisco Aguilar, footballer (b. 1949).
13 May – Adolfo Pajares, politician (b. 1937)
15 May – Juan Genovés, painter and graphic artist (b. 1930).
16 May – Julio Anguita, politician and communist leader (b. 1941).
20 May – Adolfo Nicolás, Roman Catholic Jesuit priest and Superior General (b. 1936).
21 May – Lluís Juste de Nin, cartoonist and fashion designer (b. 1945).
22 May – Antonio Bonet Correa, art historian (b. 1925).
25 May – Marcelino Campanal, footballer (b. 1932).
26 May – Miguel Artola Gallego, historian (b. 1923)

June

 4 June - Antonio Rodríguez de las Heras, Spanish historian and academic (b. 1947)
 6 June - Jordi Mestre, Spanish actor (b. 1981)

 9 June – Pau Donés, Spanish singer songwriter and guitarist (b. 1966)
 11 June – Rosa Maria Sardà, Spanish actress (b. 1941)
 12 June - Juli Sanclimens i Genescà, Spanish politician (b. 1935)
 13 June -  Pepe el Ferreiro, Spanish archaeologist (b. 1942)
 16 June 
 Federico Corriente, Spanish Arabist, lexicographer and academic (b. 1940)
 Eusebio Vélez, Spanish racing cyclist (b. 1935)
 19 June – Carlos Ruiz Zafón, Spanish novelist (b. 1964)
 20 June - Maria Lluïsa Oliveda Puig, Spanish actress (b. 1922)
 28 June - Zuriñe del Cerro, Spanish feminist activist (b. 1956)

July

 6 July - Carme Contreras i Verdiales, Spanish actress (b. 1932)
 10 July - Pep Mòdol, Spanish politician and writer (b. 1957)
 13 July - Camilo Lorenzo Iglesias, Spanish Roman Catholic prelate (b. 1940)
 15 July
 Juan José García Corral, Spanish bullfighter (b. 1952)
 Ana Romero Reguera, Spanish fighting bull rancher (b. 1931/1932)

 18 July 
 Juan Marsé, Spanish novelist, journalist and screenwriter (b. 1933)
 Lucio Urtubia, Spanish counterfeiter, robber and kidnapper (b. 1931)
 21 July - Francisco Rodríguez Adrados, Spanish Hellenist, translator and linguist (b. 1922)
 26 July
 Francisco Frutos, Spanish politician (b. 1939)
 Lluís Serrahima, Spanish writer (b. 1931)
 28 July - José Luis García Ferrero, Spanish veterinarian and politician (b. 1929)
 31 July - Joan Mari Torrealdai, 77, Spanish writer and journalist (b. 1942)

August 

 1 August
 Pablo Aranda, Spanish writer (b. 1968)
 Julio Diamante, Spanish film director (b. 1930)
 5 August - María Victoria Morera, Spanish diplomat (b. 1956)
 8 August - Pedro Casaldáliga, Spanish-Brazilian Roman Catholic prelate (b. 1928)
 9 August - Fernando Garfella Palmer, Spanish underwater documentary filmmaker and maritime activist (b. 1989)
 11 August - Juan Pastor Marco, Spanish politician (b. 1951)
 14 August - Francesc Badia Batalla, Spanish-born Andorran civil servant and magistrate (b. 1923)
 26 August - José Lamiel, Spanish painter and sculptor (b. 1924)
 30 August - Ángel Faus Belau, Spanish journalist and academic (b. 1936)

September 

 3 September - Félix Suárez Colomo, Spanish Olympic racing cyclist (b. 1950)
 12 September - Joaquín Carbonell, Spanish singer-songwriter, journalist and poet (b. 1947)
 14 September
 Enrique Ramón Fajarnés, Spanish lawyer and politician (b. 1929)
 Fer, Spanish comics artist (b. 1949)
 15 September - Vital Alsar, Spanish sailor and scientist (b. 1933)
 16 September 
 Núria Gispert i Feliu, Spanish politician (b. 1936)
 Enrique Irazoqui, Spanish actor (b. 1944)
 20 September - Gerardo Vera, Spanish costume designer, film director and actor (b. 1947)
 24 September - Jaime Blanco García, Spanish politician (b. 1944)
 28 September - Juan Carlos Guerra Zunzunegui, Spanish lawyer and politician (b. 1935)

October 

 6 October - Alfons Borrell i Palazón, Spanish abstract painter (b. 1931)
 7 October - Manuel Guerra, Spanish Olympic swimmer (b. 1928)
 13 October - Marisa de Leza, Spanish actress (b. 1933)
 15 October - Antonio Ángel Algora Hernando, Spanish Roman Catholic prelate (b. 1940)
 17 October - Aurora Chamorro, Spanish Olympic swimmer (b. 1954)
 18 October - José Padilla, Spanish DJ (b. 1955)
 19 October - Joan Mesquida, Spanish politician (b. 1962)
 25 October - Dolores Abril, Spanish singer and actress (b. 1939)
 29 October - Pablo Lozano, Spanish bullfighter and fighting bull cattle rancher (b. 1932)
 31 October - Eduardo Castelló, Spanish racing cyclist (b. 1940)

November 

 1 November
 Pedro Iturralde, Spanish saxophonist and composer (b. 1929)
 Tinín, Spanish matador (b. 1946)
 9 November 
 Domènec Fita i Molat, Spanish painter and sculptor (b. 1927)
 Carlos G. Vallés, Spanish-Indian Jesuit priest and author (b. 1925)
 10 November
 Luis Ibero, Spanish politician (b. 1949)
 Juan Sol, Spanish footballer (b. 1947)
 11 November
 Francesc-Xavier Ciuraneta Aymí, Spanish Roman Catholic prelate (b. 1940)
 Jorge Llopart, Spanish race walker (b. 1952)
 14 November - Adolfo Bolea, Spanish football player (b. 1933)
 24 November
 Montserrat Carulla, Spanish actress (b. 1930)
 Damián Iguacén Borau, Spanish Roman Catholic prelate (b. 1916)
 26 November - Alfonso Milián Sorribas, Spanish Roman Catholic prelate (b. 1939)
 28 November - Juan de Dios Román, Spanish handball coach (b. 1942)

December 
 1 December
 Faustino Amiano, Spanish Olympic coxswain (b. 1944)
 Juan Hormaechea, Spanish politician (b. 1939)
 8 December - Jordi Nadal, Spanish historian and economist (b. 1929)
 15 December
 Manuel Costas, Spanish footballer (b. 1942)
 Jorge García, Spanish footballer (b. 1957)
 25 December - Antonio Gento, Spanish footballer (b. 1940)
 26 December - Gregorio Salvador Caja, Spanish linguist (b. 1927)
 30 December
 Josep Corominas i Busqueta, Spanish doctor and politician (b. 1939)
 Gaztelu, Spanish footballer (b. 1946)

References

 
2020s in Spain
Years of the 21st century in Spain
Spain
Spain